This is a list of notable Italian Canadians who have been established in Canada. This list takes into account the entire Canadian population, which consists of Canadian citizens (by birth and by naturalization), landed immigrants and non-permanent residents and their families living with them in Canada as per the census.

A
 Bob Abate (1893 – 1981) — sports coach
 Mike Accursi — lacrosse player
 Taylor Accursi — ice hockey player
 Tony Accurso — businessman
 Jeremy Adduono — ice hockey player
 Ray Adduono — ice hockey player
 Rick Adduono — ice hockey player
 Meghan Agosta — ice hockey player
 Lucio Agostini (1913 – 1996) — composer
 Dominic Agostino (1959 – 2004) — Ontario politician
 Andrew Agozzino — ice hockey player
 Laura Albanese — politician
 Carlo Alberti — soccer player
 Valerio Alesi — soccer player
 Michael Amadio — ice hockey player
 Debbie Amaroso — Ontario politician
 Pietro Amato — musician
 Stella Ambler — politician
 Domenic Amodeo — ice hockey player
 Mike Amodeo — ice hockey player
 Enza Anderson —  journalist, media personality, Ontario politician 
 Lou Angotti — ice hockey player
 Sandy Annunziata — football player
 Tom Anselmi — businessman
 William Anselmi — academic and writer
 Salvatore Antonio — actor and playwright
 Danny Antonucci — animator, director, producer, and writer
 Richard Appignanesi — writer and editor
 Francesco Aquilini — businessman
 Luciano Aquino — ice hockey player
 Violet Archer — composer, teacher, pianist, organist, and percussionist
 Susie Arioli — jazz singer
 Robbie Aristodemo — soccer player
 Matthew Arnone — soccer player
 Michelle Arvizu — actress
 Tyler Attardo — soccer player
 Maria Augimeri — Toronto city councillor

B
 Hubert Badanai (1895 – 1986) — politician
 Carlo Baldassarra — business man
 Tony Baldinelli — politician
 Dean Bandiera — former football player
 Misstress Barbara — singer
 Mark Barberio — ice hockey player
 Carmelo Barbieri — soccer player
 Robert Barbieri — professional rugby player
 Anthony Bardaro — ice hockey player
 Carmen Barillaro (1944 – 1997) — mobster
 Luigi Bartesaghi — cyclist
 Marisa Ferretti Barth — Senator
 Rick Bartolucci — Ontario politician
 David Baseggio — ice hockey player
 Francesco Bellini — business man
 Vince Bellissimo — ice hockey player
 Sean Bentivoglio — ice hockey player
 Paul Beraldo — ice hockey player
 Lorenzo Berardinetti — Ontario politician
 Eddy Berdusco — former soccer player
 Mario Bernardi — conductor and pianist
 Massimo Bertocchi — Olympic decathlete
 Reno Bertoia — baseball player
 Jimi Bertucci — co-founder of Italian Walk of Fame
 Todd Bertuzzi — ice hockey player
 Tyler Bertuzzi — ice hockey player
 Gino Berretta — football player
 Maurizio Bevilacqua — politician
 Wayne Bianchin — ice hockey player
 Hank Biasatti — former basketball and baseball player 
 Dave Bidini — musician and writer
 Mauro Biello — former soccer player and current coach
 Luke Bilyk — actor
 Dan Biocchi — politician and former athlete
 Jack Bionda (1933 – 1999) — lacrosse and ice hockey player
 Joseph Blandisi — ice hockey player
 Michael Bonacini — celebrity chef, restaurant owner
 Brandon Bonifacio — soccer player
 Béatrice Bonifassi — vocalist
 Massimo Boninsegni — physicist and professor
 Luciano Borsato — ice hockey player
 Robert Bortuzzo — ice hockey player
 Peter Bosa (1927 – 1998) — politician
 Emilio Bottiglieri — soccer player
 Gustavo Bounous — doctor
 Garen Boyajian — actor
 Rick Bragnalo — ice hockey player
 Marco Brambilla — video artist
 Angelo Branca — British Columbian judge
 Paula Brancati — actress
 Dino Bravo, (1948 – 1993) — wrestler
 François-Joseph Bressani (1612 – 1672) — Jesuit missionary and map maker
 Gino Brito — wrestler
 Mario Brunetta — ice hockey goaltender
 Carmelo Bruzzese — mobster
 Michael Bublé — singer and actor
 Nick Bucci — baseball player
 Wally Buono — coach of British Columbia Lions
 Tommy Burns — boxer
 Silvana Burtini — soccer player
 Joe Busillo — ice hockey player
 Alessandro Busti — soccer player
 Rudy Buttignol — television network executive

C
 Charles Caccia — former politician
 Leone Caetani — Prince of Teano, politician, Islamacist, author, linguist, world traveller
 Sveva Caetani — artist
 Drake Caggiula — ice hockey player
 Paul Calandra — politician
 Salvatore Calautti (1971/72 – 2013) — mobster
 Pietro Calendino — British Columbia politician
 Marco Calliari — singer
 Jackie Callura — boxer
 Jim Camazzola — ice hockey player
 Tony Camazzola — ice hockey player
 Michael Cammalleri — ice hockey player
 Rick Campanelli — television personality
 John Campea — film critic, video blogger, internet host
 Chris Campoli — ice hockey player
 Kyle Capobianco — ice hockey player
 Herb Capozzi (1925 – 2011) — businessman
 Vittorio Capparelli — politician
 Massimo Capra — chef
 Frank Caprice — ice hockey player
 Luca Caputi — ice hockey player
 Martino Caputo — mobster
 Alessia Cara — singer, songwriter
 Giulio Caravatta — football player
 Daniel Carcillo — ice hockey player
 Marco Carducci — soccer player
 Anthony Carelli — professional wrestler, best known as Santino Marella
 Jesse Carere — actor
 Pasquale Carpino (1936 – 2005) — chef
 Luciana Carro — actress
 Alfonso Caruana — mobster
 Pat Caruso — field hockey player
 John Cassini — actor
 Tony Cassolato — ice hockey player
 Michéal Castaldo — singer, songwriter, producer, entrepreneur 
 Annamarie Castrilli — former politician
 Daniel Catenacci — ice hockey player
 Tony Caterina — politician
 Carlo Cattarello — corporal with the Canadian Armed Forces
 John Catucci — television personality
 Cosimo Cavallaro — artist, filmmaker and sculptor
 Gino Cavallini — ice hockey player
 Lucas Cavallini — soccer player
 Paul Cavallini — ice hockey player
 Giovanni Cazzetta — biker
 Salvatore Cazzetta — biker
 Paolo Ceccarelli — soccer goalkeeper
 Fulvio Cecere — actor
 Cody Ceci — ice hockey player
 Joe Ceci — politician
 Rick Celebrini — former soccer player
 Rita Celli — journalist and television personality
 Gene Ceppetelli — former soccer player
 Michael Cera — actor
 Erica Cerra — actress
 Bob Chiarelli — politician
 Charly Chiarelli — writer
 Gina Chiarelli — actress
 Peter Chiarelli — ice hockey general manager
 Rick Chiarelli — Ottawa city councillor
 Rita Chiarelli — blues singer
 Talia Chiarelli — gymnast
 Jason Chimera — ice hockey player
 Andy Chiodo — ice hockey player
 Juan Chioran — voice actor and singer
 Mario Chitaroni — ice hockey player
 Hayden Christensen — actor and producer
 Tove Christensen — actor and producer
 Frank Ciaccia — former soccer player
 John Ciaccia — cabinet minister
 Dino Ciccarelli — retired ice hockey player 
 Enrico Ciccone — retired ice hockey player; hockey player agent
 Jerry Ciccoritti — film, television, and theatre director
 Tony Cimellaro — ice hockey player
 Robert Cimetta — ice hockey player
 Joe Cimino — former politician
 Antonio di Ciocco — former politician
 Joe Cirella — retired NHL player
 Anthony Cirelli — ice hockey player
 Jason Cirone — ice hockey player
 Vittorio Coco — journalist and politician
 Andrew Cogliano — ice hockey player
 Carlo Colaiacovo — ice hockey player
 Paulo Colaiacovo — ice hockey goaltender
 Enrico Colantoni — actor
 Josh Colle — politician
 Michael Colle — Ontario politician
 Giuseppe Coluccio — mobster
 Antonio Commisso — mobster
 Cosimo Commisso — mobster
 Cosimo Commisso — scientist
 Cosimo Commisso — soccer player
 Joe Comuzzi — politician
 Enzo Concina — soccer player
 Tony Condello — wrestler
 Santo Condorelli — Olympic swimmer
 Luca Congi — football player
 Alexander Conti — actor
 Joe Contini — ice hockey player
 Carlo Corazzin — former soccer player
 Antonio Cordasco (1863 – 1921) — labourer
 Joseph Cordiano — Ontario politician
 Steve Corino — wrestler
 Rick Cornacchia — former ice hockey player and coach
 Frank Corrado — ice hockey player
 Matthew Corrente — ice hockey player
 Jim Corsi — ice hockey player
 Daniel Corso — ice hockey player
 Pat Cortina — ice hockey coach
 Frank Cosentino — football player
 Sam Cosentino — sports analyst
 Paulo Costanzo — actor
 Joseph Cramarossa — ice hockey player
 Bryan Cristante — soccer player
 Vincent Crisanti — politician
 Frank Cotroni (1931 – 2004) — mobster, Cotroni crime family
 Vincenzo Cotroni (1911 – 1984) — mobster, Cotroni crime family
 Michael Cuccione (1985 – 2001) — child actor
 Raymond Culos — author
 James Cunningham — comedian
 Antonio Cupo — actor
 Bill Cupolo — ice hockey player
 Freddy Curci — vocalist and songwriter
 Pat Curcio — ice hockey player
 Bobby Curtola — musician
 Angela Cutrone — speed skater
 William Cusano — Quebec politician
 Joe Cuzzetto — soccer player
 Rudy Cuzzetto — politician

D
 Steffi D — singer
 Matt D'Agostini — ice hockey player
 Michael D'Agostino — soccer player
 Paul D'Agostino — former soccer player
 Dalbello — recording artist
 Charlotte D'Alessio — model
 Corrie D'Alessio — ice hockey player
 Jillian D'Alessio — sprint kayaker
 Antonio D'Alfonso — bilingual writer, editor, translator and filmmaker
 John D'Amico — ice hockey player
 Scott D'Amore — professional wrestler
 Frank D'Angelo — entrepreneur
 Sabrina D'Angelo — soccer player
 Peter Dalla Riva — football player
 Cynthia Dale — actress
 Jennifer Dale — actress
 Riley Damiani — ice hockey player
 Cindy Daniel — singer
 Yvonne De Carlo (1922 – 2007) — actress
 Alex De Carolis — soccer player
 Pierre-Charles de Liette (1697 – 1749) — Colonial army officer in New France and Louisiana
 Alfredo De Gasperis (1934 – 2013) — founder of construction company ConDrain
 Filippo De Grassi (1793 – 1877) — soldier
 Pasquale de Luca — former soccer player
 Sergio De Luca — former soccer player
 Adriana DeSanctis — figure skater
 Nick De Santis — former soccer player
 Rita de Santis — politician
 Tony De Thomasis — soccer manager
 Sandro DeAngelis — football player
 Marcel DeBellis — soccer player
 Dante DeCaro — former guitarist
 Anne Marie DeCicco-Best — mayor
 Johnnie Dee — vocalist
 Dean DeFazio — ice hockey player
 Devlin DeFrancesco — race car driver
 The DeFranco Family — music group
 Tony DeFranco — singer and musician, Port Colborne, Ontario
 Vincenzo DeMaria — mobster
 Steven Del Duca — politician
 Mike Del Grande — politician
 Dean Del Mastro — former politician
 Michael Del Zotto — ice hockey player
 Vincent Della Noce — politician
 Stefan Della Rovere — ice hockey player
 Eddie Della Siepe — comedian and actor
 Raffaele Delle Donne — mobster
 Alex Delvecchio — ice hockey player
 Denny DeMarchi — multi-instrumental musician
 Steve DeMarchi — guitarist
 Ab DeMarco (1916 – 1989) — ice hockey player
 Ab DeMarco, Jr. — ice hockey player
 Bill Derlago — ice hockey player
 John DeSantis — actor
 Daniel DeSanto — actor
 Jim Devellano — businessman
 Justin DiBenedetto — ice hockey player
 Chris DiDomenico — ice hockey player
 Bob DiLuca — soccer player
 Fabio di Celmo (1965 – 1997) — entrepreneur
 Pier Giorgio Di Cicco — poet
 Caroline Di Cocco — Ontario politician
 Alan Di Fiore — screenwriter and film producer 
 Phil Di Giuseppe — ice hockey player
 Larry Di Ianni — mayor of Hamilton, Ontario
 Natalie Di Luccio — international multilingual singer
 Mary di Michele — poet, writer and academic
 Consiglio Di Nino — Senator
 Odoardo Di Santo — Ontario politician
 Sergio Di Zio — actor
 Anthony Di Biase — soccer player
 Michael Di Biase — politician
 Pier Giorgio Di Cicco  — poet, editor and priest
 Joseph Di Chiara — soccer player
 Justin Di Ciano — politician
 Gino DiFlorio — former soccer player
 Massimo Di Ioia — former soccer player
 Nicola Di Iorio — politician
 Vincenzo Di Nicola — psychologist, psychiatrist and philosopher
 Enzo Di Pede — former soccer goalkeeper
 Giuseppe di Salvatore — sports shooter
 Daniel Di Tomasso — actor
 Sergio Di Zio — actor
 Nate DiCasmirro — ice hockey player
 Debra DiGiovanni — comedian
 Rob DiMaio — ice hockey player
 Rosie DiManno — journalist
 Melissa DiMarco — actress and television personality
 Cheri DiNovo — politician
 Jim Diodati — politician
 Joe DiPenta — ice hockey player
 Michael DiPietro — ice hockey player
 David Diplacido — former soccer player
 Nick Discepola — politician
 Jason DiTullio — former soccer player
 Fabrizio Divari — tattoo artist
 Hnat Domenichelli — former ice hockey player
 Eden Donatelli — short track speedskater
 Marc Donato — actor

E
 Pat Ercoli — former soccer player
 Angelo Esposito — ice hockey player
 Phil Esposito — former ice hockey player, top NHL goalscorer of the 1960s and 1970s
 Tony Esposito — former ice hockey goaltender
 Patrick Esposito Di Napoli (1964 – 1994) — musician
 Daniella Evangelista — actress
 Linda Evangelista — supermodel
 Tony Evangelista — soccer referee
 Fred Ewanuick — actor

F
 Robby Fabbri — ice hockey player
 Joe Fabbro — politician
 Lara Fabian — singer
 Peter Fallico — designer and television personality
 Adam Fantilli — ice hockey player
 Julian Fantino — former Toronto police chief and former Ontario Provincial Police Commissioner
 Paul Faraci (1928 – 2016) — businessman
 Alvaro Farinacci — politician
 Dan Fascinato — ice hockey player
 Drew Fata — ice hockey player
 Rico Fata — ice hockey player
 Justin Fazio — ice hockey player
 Vic Fedeli — politician
 Dino Felicetti — former ice hockey player
 Landon Ferraro — ice hockey player
 Mario Ferraro — ice hockey player
 Ray Ferraro — ice hockey player, now sports analyst
 Max Ferrari — soccer player
 Edoardo Ferrari-Fontana (1878 – 1936) — tenor
 Michelle Ferreri — politician
 Marisa Ferretti Barth — politician
 Claudia Ferri — actress
 Mario Ferri — community organizer
 Dan Ferrone — Canadian football player
 Pat Fiacco — businessman
 Cosimo Filane — musician and businessperson
 Jonelle Filigno — soccer player
 Fab Filippo — actor
 Peter Fiorentino — ice hockey player
 Serge Fiori — vocalist and guitarist
 Tony Fiore — ice hockey player
 Giovanni Fiore — ice hockey player
 Joe Fiorito — journalist and novelist
 Nick Fiorucci — electronic and dance music DJ
 Vittorio Fiorucci — poster artist
 Paola Flocchini — computer scientist
 Rudy Florio — football player
 Marcus Foligno — ice hockey player
 Mike Foligno — former ice hockey player
 Nick Foligno — ice hockey player
 Joe Fontana — politician
 Lou Fontinato (1932 – 2016) — ice hockey player
 Sammy Forcillo — former politician
 Ric Formosa — musician
 Laura Fortino — ice hockey player
 John Forzani — former Canadian Football League player and businessman
 Rick Fox — basketball player (Bahamanian father)
 Lou Franceschetti — ice hockey player
 Giuliano Frano — soccer player
 Joe Fratesi — former mayor of Sault Ste. Marie, Ontario
 Matt Frattin — ice hockey player
 Jeffrey Frisch — skier
 David Fronimadis — former soccer player
 Liza Frulla — politician
 Zachary Fucale — ice hockey goaltender
 Giorgia Fumanti — singer

G
 Sarah Gadon — actress
 Phil Gaglardi (1913 – 1995) — British Columbia politician
 Tom Gaglardi — businessman
 Alfonso Gagliano (1942 – 2020) — politician involved in the sponsorship scandal
 Gaetano Gagliano (1917 – 2016) — businessman and entrepreneur
 Tony Gagliano — businessman and arts mogul
 Laurent Gagliardi — film director
 Rocco Galati — lawyer
 Steve Galluccio — screenwriter 
 Mary Garofalo — television journalist
 Luca Gasparotto — soccer player
 Simon Gatti — former soccer player
 Arturo Gatti (1972 – 2009) — professional boxer
 Mario Gentile — politician
 Ken Georgetti — labour leader
 Dianne Gerace — former track athlete
 Bruno Gerussi (1928 – 1995) — actor
 Roberto Giacomi — soccer player
 Eddie Giacomin — ice hockey player
 Mario Giallonardo — ice hockey player
 Adam Giambrone — Toronto city councillor and New Democratic Party activist
 David Giammarco — actor
 Dan Giancola — football player
 Dennis Giannini — ice hockey player
 Giacomo Gianniotti — actor
 Stefano Giliati — ice hockey player
 Basilio Giordano — politician
 Mark Giordano — ice hockey player
 Nadia Giosia — cooking personality
 Larry Giovando — politician
 Daniel Girardi — ice hockey player
 Gerome Giudice — former ice hockey player
 Joseph Giunta (1911 – 2001) — painter
 Gabriella Goliger — novelist
 Gigi Gorgeous — actress and model
 Dakota Goyo — actor
 Marc-André Gragnani — ice hockey player
 Sandro Grande — former soccer player
 Tony Grande — politician
 Thomas Grandi — skier
 Marco Grazzini — actor
 Sabrina Grdevich — actress
 Phil Lo Greco — professional boxer
 Emma Greco — ice hockey player
 Peter Greco — former soccer player
 Grimes — musician
 Julia Grosso — soccer player
 Peter Guarasci — basketball player
 Albina Guarnieri — politician
 Aldo Guidolin (1932 – 2015) — ice hockey player
 Bep Guidolin (1925 – 2008) — ice hockey player
 Garry Guzzo — Ontario politician
 Patsy Guzzo (1914 – 1993) — ice hockey player
 Vincenzo Guzzo — entrepreneur

H
 Jacqueline Hennessy — journalist and television personality
 Jill Hennessy — actress and musician
 Jacob Hoggard — musician, lead singer of the pop-rock band Hedley
 Linda Hutcheon (Bortolotti) — Toronto academic, literary and opera scholar

I
 Selenia Iacchelli — soccer player
 Frank Iacobucci — former Supreme Court of Canada justice
 Angelo Iacono — politician
 Lucio Ianiero — former soccer player
 Tony Ianno — politician
 Dan Iannuzzi — entrepreneur
 Tony Ianzelo — director and cinematographer
 Robert Iarusci — former soccer player
 Andrea Iervolino — film producer
 Illangelo — musician
 Lily Inglis (1926 – 2010) — architect
 Ralph Intranuovo — former ice hockey player
 Carmine Isacco — soccer coach

J
 Alessandro Juliani — voice actor
 John Juliani (1940 – 2003) — actor

K
 Ethan Kath — singer and songwriter
 Jessica Parker Kennedy — actress
 Vince Kerrio — businessman and politician
 Victor Kodelja — former soccer player

L
 Alyssa Lagonia — soccer player
 David Lametti — politician
 Thomas W. LaSorda — Vice-Chairman and President of Chrysler
 Florence Lassandro (1900 – 1923) — mobster; last woman to be executed in Alberta
 Nicholas Latifi — race car driver
 Patricia Lattanzio — politician
 Stephen Lecce — politician
 Tony Lecce — former soccer player
 Patrice Lefebvre — former ice hockey player
 Betta Lemme — singer and songwriter
 Bob Lenarduzzi — soccer player and coach
 Mike Lenarduzzi — former ice hockey player
 Sam Lenarduzzi — former soccer player
 Frank Lenti — biker
 Laureano Leone — former Ontario politician
 Lucas Lessio — ice hockey player
 Tino Lettieri — former soccer player
 Tony Licari (1921 – 2013) — ice hockey player
 Carlo Liconti — film producer
 Peter Li Preti — former politician
 Marc Liegghio — football player
 Tony Loffreda — Senator from Quebec
 Spencer Lofranco — actor
 Luigi Logrippo — professor
 Johnny Lombardi — broadcasting executive
 Matthew Lombardi — ice hockey player
 Andrea Lombardo — soccer player
 Carmen Lombardo (1903 – 1971) — musician
 Guy Lombardo (1902 – 1977) — musician and band leader
 Lebert Lombardo — musician
 Victor Lombardo — musician
 Rocco Luccisano — politician
 Roberto Luongo — ice hockey goaltender
 Tony Lupusella — former politician

M
 François N. Macerola — lawyer and film executive
 Cosmo Maciocia — politician
 Danny Maciocia — football coach
 Antonio Macrì (1902 – 1975) — mobster
 Joe Magliocca — politician
 Franco Magnifico — businessman and politician
 Raine Maida — musician (Our Lady Peace)
 Ray Maluta — ice hockey player
 Giorgio Mammoliti — Ontario politician
 Mark Mancari — ice hockey player
 Joseph Mancinelli — trade unionist
 Gaby Mancini — former boxer
 Remo Mancini — former politician
 Tony Mancini (? – 1995) — former boxer
 Nick Mancuso — actor
 Andrew Mangiapane — ice hockey player
 Chris Mannella — soccer player
 Anthony S. Manera — former CBC president
 Cesare Maniago — former ice hockey player
 Bob Manno — former ice hockey player
 Maurizio Mansi — former ice hockey player
 Jay Manuel — make-up artist
 Carmine Marcantonio — former soccer player
 Rosario Marchese — Ontario politician
 Sergio Marchi — politician
 Sergio Marchionne (1952 – 2018) — former CEO of Fiat and Chrysler
 Charles Marega — sculptor
 Carlo Marini — former soccer player
 Hector Marini — former ice hockey player
 Frank Marino — guitarist
 Rebecca Marino — tennis player
 Dan Marouelli — former ice hockey referee
 Joseph Marrese — former politician
 Gabriella Martinelli — film producer
 Medo Martinello — former box lacrosse
 Quinto Martini — politician and real estate broker
 Adam Mascherin — ice hockey player
 Paul Masotti — former football player
 Jack Masters — politician
 Pat Mastroianni — actor
 Gabe Mastromatteo — swimmer
 Irene Mathyssen — politician
 Gino Matrundola — former politician
 Jon Matsumoto — ice hockey player
 Joe Mattacchione — former soccer player
 Ella Matteucci — ice hockey and baseball player
 Mike Matteucci — ice hockey player
 Arthur Mauro — lawyer and businessman
 Bill Mauro — Ontario politician
 Frank Mazzilli — former politician
 Frank Mazzuca — former politician
 Joe Mazzucco — race car driver
 Tyler Medeiros — singer
 Julian Melchiori — ice hockey player
 Mary Melfi — novelist, poet, playwright
 Victor Mete — ice hockey player
 Tanya Memme — television presenter and actress in Sell This House
 Gerry Mendicino — actor
 Marco Mendicino — politician
 Paul Meschino — architect
 Corrado Micalef — former ice hockey player
 Angelo Miceli — ice hockey player
 Salvatore Miceli — mobster
 Marco Micone — Quebec academic, playwright and translator
 Thomas Milani — former ice hockey player
 Ramona Milano — actress
 Maria Minna — politician
 Eddie Mio — former ice hockey goaltender
 Domenic Mobilio (1969 – 2004) — former soccer player
 Guido Molinari (1933 – 2004) — artist
 Melissa Molinaro — model
 Alessandro Momesso — soccer player
 Sergio Momesso — ice hockey player
 Richard Monette (1944 – 2008) — actor and director
 Victor Montagliani — businessman, former president of Canadian Soccer Association
 Salvatore Montagna (1971 – 2011) — mobster
 Enio Mora (1949 – 1996) — mobster
 Angie Moretto — former ice hockey player
 Marc Moro — former ice hockey player
 Mike Morreale — former football player
 Joe Morselli — Quebec businessman involved in the Sponsorship scandal 
 Carmelina Moscato — soccer player
 Domenico Moschella — politician
 Giovanni Muscedere — biker and mobster. 
 Marcello Musto — professor
 Jason Muzzatti — former ice hockey player
 Jake Muzzin — ice hockey player

N
 Angelina Napolitano (1882 – 1932) — first woman in Canada to use the battered woman defence on a murder charge
 Tony Nappo — actor
 Tony Nardi — bilingual actor
 Silvio Narizzano — film and television director
 Angelo Natale — former trade union leader
 Vincenzo Natali — film director and screenwriter
 Sergio Navarretta — film director and producer
 Nick Nero — mobster
 Davide Nicoletti — ice hockey player
 Sabatino Nicolucci — mobster
 Frank Nigro — former ice hockey player
 Guido Nincheri (1885 – 1973) — artist
 Aldo Nova — musician and vocalist
 Frances Nunziata — Toronto city councillor
 John Nunziata — politician

O
 Peter Oliva — novelist
 Andrew Olivieri — former soccer player
 Nancy Olivieri — haematologist
 Giuliano Oliviero — former soccer player
 America Olivo — actress, singer, and model
 David Orazietti — politician
 Alexandra Orlando — rhythmic gymnast
 Gaetano Orlando — ice hockey player
 Johnny Orlando — singer
 Marina Orsini — actress
 Romano Orzari — actor

P
 Frank G. Paci — writer, author of The Italians and 12 novels
 Massimo Pacetti — politician
 Donato Paduano — former boxer
 Pete Palangio (1908 – 2004) — ice hockey player
 Al Palladini (1943 – 2001) — politician
 Matthew Palleschi — professional soccer player
 Louie Palu — photographer and filmmaker
 Roberto Pannunzi — mobster
 Joe Pantalone — Toronto city councillor
 Alessandra Paonessa — opera singer
 Johnny Papalia (1924 – 1997) — mobster
 Melanie Papalia — actress
 John Parco — ice hockey coach
 Sarina Paris — singer
 Tony Parisi (1941 – 2000) — wrestler
 Paul Bonifacio Parkinson — figure skater
 Tony Parsons — presenter
 Mario Parente — biker
 Eli Pasquale — former basketball player
 Nico Pasquotti — soccer player
 Lui Passaglia — former football player
 Patrizia — singer
 Bruno Pauletto — physiologist
 Michael Peca — ice hockey player
 [James Anthony Pecchia] Guitarist-Musician
 Maria Pellegrini — operatic soprano
 Bob Perani (1942 – 2012) — ice hockey goaltender
 Cole Perfetti — ice hockey player
 Brendan Perlini — ice hockey player
 Fred Perlini — ice hockey player
 Dominic Perri — politician
 Paul Perri — actor
 Rocco Perri (1887 – ?) — mobster
 Sandro Perri — musician
 Anthony Perruzza — Ontario politician
 Jordan Perruzza — soccer player
 Angelo Persichilli — journalist
 Joe Peschisolido — politician
 Paul Peschisolido — soccer player
 Alex Petan — ice hockey player
 Nic Petan — ice hockey player
 Luca Petrasso — soccer player
 Michael Petrasso — soccer player
 Andi Petrillo — sports anchor
 Penny Petrone (1925 – 2005) — writer and educator
 Nina Petronzio — interior designer
 Emilio Picariello (1875 or 1879 – 1923) — mobster
 David Piccini — politician
 Joe Piccininni — city councillor
 Alessandra Piccione — screenwriter and producer
 Alex Pietrangelo — ice hockey player
 Amelia Pietrangelo — soccer player
 Frank Pietrangelo — ice hockey player
 Phil Pietroniro — ice hockey player
 Paolo Pietropaolo — radio host and musician
 Vincenzo Pietropaolo — photographer
 Tony Pignatiello — soccer player
 Gary Pillitteri — politician
 Peter Pinizzotto — soccer coach
 Steve Pinizzotto — ice hockey player
 Roy Piovesana — teacher and historian
 Fernando Pisani — ice hockey player
 Matteo Piscopo — soccer player
 Joseph Pivato — writer, literary scholar and academic
 Nevio Pizzolitto — soccer player
 Rocco Placentino — soccer player
 Nick Plastino — ice hockey player
 Johnny Plescio — biker
 Robert Poëti — politician
 Marco Polo — music producer
 Claudio Polsinelli — former Ontario politician
 Aaron Poole — actor
 Carly Pope — actress
 Kris Pope — actor
 Victor Posa — former National Hockey League player
 Christian Potenza — actor
 John Potestio — writer
 Gene Principe — sports reporter
 Giovanni Princigalli — film director
 Monica Proietti, aka Machine Gun Molly (1940 – 1967)  — bank robber
 Cristine Prosperi — actress
 Carmen Provenzano (1942 – 2005) — politician 
 Christian Provenzano — politician
 Dina Pugliese — Toronto television personality
 Sandra Pupatello — Ontario politician
 Christina Putigna — ice hockey player

Q
 Louis Quilico (1925 – 2000) — opera singer

R
 Gianmarco Raimondo — racing driver
 Mauro Ranallo — sportscaster
 Simone Rapisarda Casanova — filmmaker
 Gennaro Raso — biker
 Rick Ravanello — actor
 Mark Recchi — ice hockey player
 Gino Reda — television personality
 Marco Reda — soccer player
 Karen Redman — politician
 Paolo Renda (1933 – Disappeared 2010) — mobster
 Austin Ricci — soccer player
 Italia Ricci — actress
 Mike Ricci — former ice hockey player
 Mike Ricci — fighter
 Nick Ricci — former ice hockey player
 Nino Ricci — novelist
 Regolo Ricci — artist
 Alessandro Riggi — soccer player
 Lou Rinaldi — politician
 Nicola Riopel — ice hockey goaltender
 Marco Rizi — former soccer player
 Tony Rizzo — Ontario politician
 Garth Rizzuto — former ice hockey player
 Nicolo Rizzuto (1924 – 2010) — mobster, Rizzuto crime family
 Pietro Rizzuto (1934 – 1997) — businessman and Senator
 Vito Rizzuto (1946 – 2013) — mobster
 Darcy Robinson (1981 – 2007) — ice hockey player
 David Rocco — actor, producer, and cooking personality
 Vince Rocco — ice hockey player
 Tony Romandini — musician
 Jordan Romano — professional baseball player
 Roberto Romano — former ice hockey goaltender
 Rocco Romano — football player
 Ross Romano — Ontario politician
 Rocco Romeo — soccer player
 Marco Rosa — ice hockey player
 Mike Rosati — former ice hockey player
 Cristina Rosato — actress
 Tony Rosato (1954 – 2017) — actor
 Anthony Rosenroll (1857 – 1945) — businessman
 Carlo Rossi — politician
 Chantal Rossi — politician
 Rocco Rossi — businessman
 Vittorio Rossi — playwright, screenwriter, actor, and director 
 Anthony Rota — politician
 Carlo Rota — actor
 Filomena Rotiroti — politician
 Guy Rubino — chef
 Steve Rucchin — former ice hockey player
 Adamo Ruggiero — actor
 Adam Russo — ice hockey goaltender
 Erminia Russo — volleyball player

S
 Laura Sabia (1916 – 1996) — social activist and feminist
 Michael Sabia — businessman
 Ted Salci — former mayor
 Frank Salerno (1962 – 2006) — biker
 Alphonse W. Salomone Jr. (1919 – 1993) — hotelier
 Dave Salmoni — animal trainer, entertainer and television producer
 Bobby Sanguinetti — ice hockey player
 Greg Sansone — former sports anchor
 Ivana Santilli — singer
 Mike Santorelli — ice hockey player
 Angelo Santucci — former football player
 Daniela Sanzone — journalist
 Joey Saputo — businessman
 Lino Saputo — businessman and billionaire – owner of Saputo Inc.
 Will Sasso — actor and comedian
 Ryan Savoia — ice hockey player
 Raymond Sawada — ice hockey player
 Giulio Scandella — ice hockey player
 Marco Scandella — ice hockey player
 Ray Scapinello — ice hockey player
 Michele Scarabelli — actress
 Pietro Scarcella — mobster
 Michael Scarola — sprint canoer
 Francis Scarpaleggia — politician
 Frank Scarpitti — mayor
 Gino Schiraldi — former soccer player
 Joe Schiraldi — former soccer player
 Enio Sclisizzi (1925 – 2012) —  ice hockey player
 Melanie Scrofano — actress
 Rob Scuderi — ice hockey player
 Lorraine Segato — singer
 Mario Sergio — Ontario politician
 Judy Sgro — politician
 Dave Siciliano — ice hockey coach and player
 Floria Sigismondi — photographer
 Tony Silipo — former Ontario politician
 Margot Sikabonyi — actress
 Andrew Simone — physician
 Hannah Simone — television personality
 Gino Soccio — disco record producer
 Rocco Sollecito (1949 – 2016) — mobster
 Francesco Sorbara — politician
 Greg Sorbara — Ontario politician
 Martina Sorbara — singer-songwriter
 Erin Spanevello (1987 – 2008) — fashion model
 Michelangelo Spensieri (1949 – 2013) — politician
 Jason Spezza — ice hockey player
 Paul Stalteri — soccer player
 Alexander David Stewart (1852 – 1899) — politician
 Chelsea Stewart — soccer player
 Steben Twins — acrobatic performers
 Zack Stortini — ice hockey player
 Sylvana Windsor, Countess of St Andrews — countess

T
 Rick Tabaracci — former ice hockey goaltender
 Alex Tagliani — race car driver
 Joe Tallari — ice hockey player
 Melissa Tancredi — soccer player
 Jeff Tambellini — ice hockey player
 Steve Tambellini — ice hockey general manager
 Paul Tana — film director
 Filomena Tassi — politician
 Dino Tavarone — actor
 Marco Terminesi — soccer player
 Anna Terrana — former politician
 Venus Terzo — actress
 Michael Tibollo — politician
 Martin Tielli — musician and artist
 Mark Tinordi — former ice hockey player
 Tony Tirabassi — politician
 Guido Titotto — former soccer player
 Rick Tocchet — ice hockey player
 Tyler Toffoli — ice hockey player
Philip Tomasino — ice hockey player
 Tony Tomassi — politician
 Tiger Joe Tomasso (1922 – 1988) — former wrestler
 John Tonelli — former ice hockey player
 Henri de Tonti (1649 – 1704) — explorer in New France
 Alphonse de Tonty (1659 – 1727) — explorer in New France
 Jerry Toppazzini (1931 – 2012) — ice hockey player
 Zellio Toppazzini (1930 – 2001) — ice hockey player
 Raffi Torres — ice hockey player
 Joe Trasolini politician
 Anna Maria Tremonti — journalist and CBC radio announcer
 Carter Trevisani — ice hockey player
 Jay Triano — former basketball player
 Ricardo Trogi — actor and filmmaker
 Domenic Troiano (1946 – 2005) — musician
 Marty Turco — ice hockey goaltender

U
 Gene Ubriaco — former ice hockey player
 Julian Uccello — soccer player
 Luca Uccello — soccer player

V
 Tony Valeri — politician
 Frank Valeriote — politician
 Joseph Valtellini — kickboxer
 Gino Vannelli — musician
 Joe Vannelli — musician
 Phil Varone — ice hockey player
 Joe Veleno — ice hockey player
 Frank Venneri — politician
 Carmine Verduci (1959 – 2014) — mobster
 Mike Vernace — ice hockey player
 Ben Viccari — former journalist
 Paolo Violi (1938 – 1978) — mobster
 David Visentin — actor
 Joe Volpe — politician
 Paul Volpe (1927 – 1983) — mobster
 Joey Votto — baseball player
 Lisa Vultaggio — actress

W
 Graham Wardle — actor, filmmaker and photographer 
 Jeff Wincott — martial artist and actor
 Michael Wincott — actor

X
 Davide Xausa — former soccer player

Z
 Giuliano Zaccardelli — former Commissioner of the Royal Canadian Mounted Police
 Robert Zambito — politician
 Frank Zampino — politician and accountant
 Dominic Zamprogna — actor
 Sergio Zanatta — former soccer player
 Paul Zanette — ice hockey player
 Sol Zanetti — politician
 Chiara Zanni — actress
 Ron Zanussi — former ice hockey player
 Zappacosta — singer and songwriter
 Sergio Zardini — bobsledder
 Bruno Zarrillo — former ice hockey player
 Gianluca Zavarise — soccer player
 Rachel Zeffira — musician
 Lorena Ziraldo — artist
 Rocco Zito (1928 – 2016) — mobster
 Katia Zuccarelli — singer

References

C
Italian